The following lists events that happened during 1950 in Cape Verde.

Incumbents
Colonial governor: Carlos Alberto Garcia Alves Roçadas

Events
Population: 149,348

Sports
CS Mindelense won the Cape Verdean Football Championship

Births
João Lopes Filho, professor, anthropologist, historian and writer
June 4: Eddy Fort Moda Grog, singer

References

 
Years of the 20th century in Cape Verde
1950s in Cape Verde
Cape Verde
Cape Verde